Phiala albida is a moth in the family Eupterotidae. It was described by Plötz in 1880. It is found in the Central African Republic and Cameroon.

References

Moths described in 1880
Eupterotinae